Ton Pattinama (born 30 July 1956, Rotterdam) is a retired Dutch footballer who played for Excelsior, FC Den Bosch, FC Utrecht, Heracles Almelo and ADO Den Haag. Football players Edinho (NAC Breda) and Jordao Pattinama (Feyenoord) are his sons.

Pattinama played for the (Dutch) Moluccan team several times.

External links
  Player profile at Voetbal International

References 

1956 births
Living people
Dutch footballers
Excelsior Rotterdam players
FC Den Bosch players
FC Utrecht players
Heracles Almelo players
ADO Den Haag players
Footballers from Rotterdam
Association football midfielders
Dutch people of Moluccan descent